Udu Kumburage Sumith Udukumbura Weerasinghe (born 15 January 1975) is a Sri Lankan politician and Member of Parliament.

Udukumbura was born on 15 January 1975. He was educated at St. Anne's College, Kurunegala. He was a police officer. In January 2010 his home attacked with hand bombs. He is the Sri Lanka Podujana Peramuna's organiser in Hiriyala.

Udukumbura was a member of Ibbagamuwa Divisional Council. He contested the 2020 parliamentary election as a Sri Lanka People's Freedom Alliance electoral alliance candidate in Kurunegala District and was elected to the Parliament of Sri Lanka.

References

1975 births
Alumni of St. Anne's College, Kurunegala
Local authority councillors of Sri Lanka
Living people
Members of the 16th Parliament of Sri Lanka
Sinhalese police officers
Sinhalese politicians
Sri Lankan Buddhists
Sri Lanka People's Freedom Alliance politicians
Sri Lanka Podujana Peramuna politicians